Jessica Kate Wilson is a Liberal Party member of the Victorian Legislative Assembly for the seat of Kew. Prior to her candidacy, Wilson was the executive director of the Business Council of Australia.

Politics 
Prior to her candidacy for the Kew seat, Wilson worked as an adviser to former federal energy minister Josh Frydenberg and as Director at the Business Council of Australia. Additionally, she was a former president of the Victorian Young Liberals.

Wilson was preselected to be Liberal candidate for the traditionally safe Liberal seat of Kew after defeating a number of pre-selection candidates including a senior Victorian Liberal figure, David Davis. At the 2022 Victorian state election, she defeated teal independent Sophie Torney and Labor candidate Lucy Skelton.

On 18 December 2022, Liberal Party leader John Pesutto announced that Wilson would join the opposition front bench becoming the Shadow Minister for Finance, Shadow Minister for Economic Reform and Regulation, and Shadow Minister for Home Ownership and Housing Affordability.

Personal life 
Wilson grew up in Melbourne's inner east attending Mont Albert Primary School, secondary school at Strathcona Baptist Girls Grammar, and completing tertiary education at Monash University. Wilson is passionate about hockey, playing for the Kew Box Hill Hockey Club, and she also barracks for the Collingwood Football Club.

References 

1990 births
Living people
Politicians from Melbourne
Members of the Victorian Legislative Assembly
Monash Law School alumni
21st-century Australian politicians
Liberal Party of Australia members of the Parliament of Victoria
21st-century Australian women politicians
Women members of the Victorian Legislative Assembly